KLGB-LP (94.3 FM) was a low-power radio station broadcasting a Contemporary Christian format. Licensed to Enid, Oklahoma, United States, the station was owned by Covenant Life Ministries, Inc.

Covenant Life Ministries surrendered KLGB-LP's license to the Federal Communications Commission on January 19, 2022, who cancelled it the same day.

References

External links

LGB-LP
LGB-LP
LGB-LP
Radio stations established in 2003
2003 establishments in Oklahoma
Defunct radio stations in the United States
Radio stations disestablished in 2022
2022 disestablishments in Oklahoma